, also known as Peyo, was a Japanese manga artist. He is best known for creating Boy meets Maria.

Biography 
Kosei Eguchi was born on July 29, 1997. In his childhood, he often played alone, making stories with finger puppets. He liked to draw and during his time in elementary school he drew comic strips. Although he had a good level as a draftsman, he was reluctant to think about it, so he communicated with others through painting. His family did not agree with him becoming a mangaka, as not all of them could be successful. However, an editor at Printemps Publishing had taken an interest in Eguchi when he was studying oil painting with a view to entering the Tokyo University of the Arts. He began his professional career in 2017 with the publication of the BL manga, Boy meets Maria, under the pseudonym Peyo. 

A Kodansha editor, who read Boy meets Maria, contacted him via Twitter by direct message, and in 2019, he initiated the publication of a new manga, changing the BL genre to shonen, titled Kimio Alive in Monthly Shonen Magazine, having as its protagonist a high school student who dreams of becoming a YouTuber. In that case the author decided to reveal and use his real name. The publication of the manga had problems due to the outbreak of the COVID-19 pandemic in Japan, the establishment of a state of emergency in Japan and the lack of promotion in bookstores, which led Kodansha to consider canceling the work after the second volume went on sale. On the same day the volume was published, Eguchi was urgently hospitalized. Two days later he passed away suddenly, on August 19, 2020 at the age of 23. The cause of death was not revealed. As a result, Kimio Alive, ceased publication in September 2020.

Works 
  (serialized in Printemps Shuppan) (2018)
  (serialized in Monthly Shonen Magazine) (2020)

References 

1997 births
2020 deaths
Manga artists